Rodolfo Casanova, also known as Baby Casanova or ''Chango'' Casanova (June 21, 1915 – November 23, 1980) was a Mexican professional boxer. He was also the first Mexican to fight a Puerto Rican in the Mexico – Puerto Rico boxing rivalry.

Early life
Rodolfo was born during the Mexican Revolution, his father Don Rafael Casanova died in that war. His mother moved the family to Mexico City after the death. Casanova grew up very poor and started boxing only after his older brother Carlos, an amateur boxer, had no official government backing to attend the 1928 Summer Olympics.

Professional career

World Bantamweight Championship
In his first attempt at a world title, Casanova lost to Sixto Escobar the World Bantamweight Champion. This would be the first world title fight between a Mexican and a Puerto Rican.

See also
Mexico – Puerto Rico boxing rivalry

References

External links

Boxers from Guanajuato
Sportspeople from León, Guanajuato
Featherweight boxers
1915 births
1980 deaths
Mexican male boxers